Neuron-specific vesicular protein calcyon is a protein that in humans is encoded by the CALY gene. Its alternative name is Calcyon.

Function 

The protein encoded by this gene is a type II single transmembrane protein. It is required for maximal stimulated calcium release after stimulation of purinergic or muscarinic but not beta-adrenergic receptors. The encoded protein interacts with dopamine receptor D1 and may interact with other DA receptor subtypes and/or GPCRs.

Interactions
 SPARCL1 (hevin)

References

Further reading